The FCF Zappers are a professional indoor football team founded on December 2, 2020. They are a member of the Fan Controlled Football League and are currently owned by Trevor May, Dalvin Cook, Bob Menery, Ronnie Singh, and Stephen Deleonardis.

History 
On December 2, 2020, the Zappers' team name and logo were announced, along with three other teams (Glacier Boyz, Beasts, and Wild Aces). On January 14, 2021, all four team uniforms were revealed.

2021 Season V1.0 
On December 30, 2020, It was announced that former Heisman Trophy Winner Johnny Manziel had signed with the Zappers.

The Zappers lost their first franchise game 48–44 against the Beasts on February 13, 2021.

On February 27, 2021, it was announced that Josh Gordon had signed with the Zappers after being suspended indefinitely by the NFL.

The Zappers finished the regular season 2–2, securing the #2 seed in the playoffs, but ultimately lost to the #2 seed Wild Aces 32–6 in the semifinals, finishing the 2021 Fan Controlled Football season 2–3.

Roster

2022 season
For 2022, Manziel agreed to return to the team as a player-coach. The team used its other franchise tag to sign Terrell Owens, a Pro Football Hall of Fame wide receiver who last played professionally in 2012. Before week 5 begun, the fans were asked if they wanted to trade H.O.F Terrell Owens, as well as the 1st and 16th pick in that weeks draft, for Beasts QB Jason Stewart as well as the 5th and 10th pick in the upcoming draft. The trade was accepted making it the first trade In league history.

The franchise won its third game in team history, and first of the season in week 5 defeating the year 1 champion Shoulda been stars 28-24.

References 

Fan Controlled Football
Indoor American football teams in the United States
American football teams established in 2020